Life with You, released in 2007, is the seventh studio album by the Proclaimers. It appeared on W14, a joint venture label between Universal Records and John Williams, the man who gave the Proclaimers their first recording contract on Chrysalis Records. The album reached number 13 in the UK albums chart.

Recording
Life with You was recorded in Wales at Rockfield Studios in Monmouthshire.

Themes and style 
The lyrics of Life with You covered a variety of emotionally charged topics, including consumerism, racism, political leaders and war. "Here it Comes Again" condemned misogynistic attitudes in pop music, York Press opined "The Long Haul" to "lacerate" US President  George Bush, while "S-O-R-R-Y" was a disgusted reflection on Tony Blair and warmongering media during the Iraq War. Other themes on the record surrounded love and relationships, such as "Harness Pain" which Charles Hutchinson opined to "embrace heartbreak like R.E.M.".

Critical reception 

Life with You received an aggregate score of 65/100 from Metacritic suggesting "generally favorable reviews" according to 7 critics. Linda Gaban of the Boston Globe was praising of the political nature of the album, commenting "as in-you-face as [the band's hits] are, the Proclaimers are at their best when, well, proclaiming and protesting vehemently over simple melodies", declaring the political ballad "S-O-R-R-Y" to be an "essential" cut.

Regardless, Maura Walz of PopMatters was dismissive of the record, opining that "the production feels mostly flat and the album as a whole never comes alive", and that the lyrics, while "heartfelt", were "nimble as a steamroller".

Charles Hutchinson of York Press gave a lauding, 4-out-of-5-star review of Life with You, opining the band's melodies to "still roll like Scottish mist", and praising the Proclaimers' lyrics to "nail political folly in a manner feared lost since the peak of The Specials and Elvis Costello".

Track listing

Certifications

References

The Proclaimers albums
2007 albums
Albums recorded at Rockfield Studios